Saeed Hallafi (born 20 May 1990 in Ahvaz) is an Iranian footballer who currently plays as winger for Malavan in Azadegan League.

Club career
He started his professional career in Sanat Naft he famously scored two goals in the Azadi Stadium against Esteghlal Tehran as a 17 years old helping his team win 2–3 away from home. He moved to Pas but did not play any match. He moved back to Sanat Naft for the next season in First Division.

He joined Pesepolis in 2009 for two years deal but in the first half-season he did not play a single match for them; then he was loaned to Rah Ahan until the end of 2009–2010 season. In the next season he only had 3 starts for Persepolis but scored a winning goal against Damash at round-16 of Hazfi Cup.
In the beginning of 2012 he moved back to Sanat Naft once again but later in December 2012 he was fired from Sanat Naft. After he terminated his contract with Sanat, when everyone thought he will be joining Malavan instead he signed a two and half years deal with Damash Gilan on the last day of transfer window.

Perspolis

2007 Sanat Naft pas hamadan 2009 Sanat Naft  2011 perspolis  2012 mashin Sazi 2013 Damash

2014 peykan 2016 pars jonobi jam 2017 Saba qom 2018 Naft Al-wasat 2019 malavan

Club career statistics

 Assist Goals

Honours
Persepolis
Hazfi Cup (1): 2010–11

References

External links

Saeid Hallafi at Soccerway

Iranian footballers
Iranian expatriate footballers
Living people
1990 births
PAS Hamedan F.C. players
Sanat Naft Abadan F.C. players
Rah Ahan players
Persepolis F.C. players
Damash Gilan players
Machine Sazi F.C. players
Paykan F.C. players
Niroye Zamini players
Naft Al-Wasat SC players
Association football wingers
Iranian expatriate sportspeople in Iraq
Expatriate footballers in Iraq
People from Ahvaz
Sportspeople from Khuzestan province